Agyneta iranica is a species of sheet weaver spider (family Linyphiidae) found in Iran. It was first described by Tanasevitch in 2011.

References

iranica
Spiders described in 2011
Spiders of Asia